Marie Vilmann (born 21 October 1993) is a Danish professional racing cyclist, who last rode for UCI Women's Team .

See also
 List of 2016 UCI Women's Teams and riders

References

External links
 

1993 births
Living people
Danish female cyclists
Place of birth missing (living people)
21st-century Danish women